Haute Matsiatra (in Malagasy: Matsiatra Ambony) is a region in Madagascar. It borders Amoron'i Mania region in north, Vatovavy-Fitovinany in east, Ihorombe in south and Atsimo-Andrefana in west. The capital of the region is Fianarantsoa, and the population was 1,447,296 in 2018.

Economy
Matsiatra Ambony is the top wine producing region of Madagascar, with wineyards in Ambalavao, Famoriana and Isandra (district).
In Sahambavy is found the only tea production of the country.

Administrative divisions
Haute Matsiatra Region is divided into seven districts, which are sub-divided into 84 communes.

 Ambalavao District - 17 communes; 215,094 inhabitants
 Ambohimahasoa District - 17 communes; 220,525 inhabitants
 Fianarantsoa District - 1 commune; 195,478 inhabitants
 Ikalamavony District - 8 communes; 91,797 inhabitants
 Isandra District - 13 communes; 132,971 inhabitants
 Lalangina District - 13 communes; 174,165 inhabitants
 Vohibato District - 15 communes; 201,666 inhabitants

Transport

Airports
Ambalavao Airport
Fianarantsoa Airport

Railways
The Fianarantsoa-Côte Est railway has its endpoint in Fianarantsoa. It leads to the east coast and Manakara.

Roads
 National road 7 (Antananarivo - Tulear)
 National road 25 (Fianarantsoa - Mananjary)
 National road 42 A short secondary highway from Fianarantsoa to Isorana.
 National road 45 - a shortcut from National road 7 to National road 25.

Rivers
The main river is the Matsiatra.

Protected areas
Part of Fandriana-Vondrozo Corridor
 Andringitra National Park
 Part of Ranomafana National Park
 Anja Community Reserve
 the cliffs & caves of Isandra

See also
Ranotsara

References

 
Regions of Madagascar